Maciej Daniel Wojtkowski (born 1975 in Włocławek, Kujawy) is a Polish physicist, specializing in physical optics and medical applications of optics, and founder and director of the International Centre for Translational Eye Research (ICTER) in Warsaw, Poland. Wojtkowski is the inventor of the first prototype clinical SdOCT device for eye imaging, built at the Massachusetts Institute of Technology and tested at the New England Eye Center in Boston USA, and the second built at the Nicolaus Copernicus University in Toruń and tested at the Jurasz Ophthalmology Clinic in Bydgoszcz. This device is used for non-invasive, non-contact eye examinations in clinics all over the world to monitor the onset, progression, and therapy of eye diseases.

Wojtkowski's research focuses on understanding the interaction of light with living tissue and the potential for in vivo imaging using optical methods. With his work he has made significant contributions to development of the Optical Coherence Tomography (OCT) method and understanding of the two-photon vision phenomenon. In 2003, Wojtkowski was the first to demonstrate the possibility of 100-fold acceleration of OCT, by introducing Fourier domain detection (FdOCT, also called spectral domain OCT), in human eye imaging. With this work, he broke new ground for in vivo 3D imaging and quantitative morphometric analysis of the human eye, which have been implemented in many medical devices available in ophthalmic clinics around the world. Wojtkowski is the author of seven patents and more than 260 publications, including 130 in top-ranked journals.

Wojtkowski pursued his graduate studies with the Faculty of Physics and Astronomy, Nicolaus Copernicus University in Torun, Poland, where he received his MSc in experimental physics in 1999, his PhD in physical sciences in 2003, and his habilitation in the same discipline in 2010. At his alma mater, Wojtkowski also collaborated with Andrzej Kowalczyk to establish the Medical Physics research group, which he later led until 2016 as the Optical Biomedical Imaging Group. After succeeding in the 2015 EraChair competition, Wojtkowski has been associated with the Institute of Physical Chemistry of the Polish Academy of Sciences in Warsaw, where he is the head of the Department of Physical Chemistry of Biological Systems, and chair of the Physical Optics and Biophotonics research group. Since 2019, he is also the head of the International Center for Translational Eye Research (ICTER) at the Institute of Physical Chemistry of the Polish Academy of Sciences, funded by the Foundation for Polish Science as part of the International Research Agendas Program. During his academic career, Wojtkowski has completed numerous research internships at institutions around the world, including the University of Vienna, Austria; University of Kent, Canterbury, England; Massachusetts Institute of Technology, USA; and University of Western Australia, Perth, Australia.

Awards 
In 2007, Wojtkowski received the prestigious European Young Investigator Award research grant, enabling him to fund his own research group for five years. In 2012, Wojtkowski received the Prize of the Foundation for Polish Science in the field of Mathematical and Physical Sciences and Engineering. Wojtkowski's scientific activity has been recognized by several distinguished bodies, including the President of the Council of Ministers of the Republic of Poland (First Degree Award for his habilitation thesis in 2010); Authorities of the Faculty of Physics of the University of Warsaw (Professor Stefan Pieńkowski Award in 2004), Authorities of the Warsaw University of Technology (Medal of a Young Scientist in 2008); and the Chapter of the Polityka Weekly Scholarships (action "Stay with us" in 2001). Since 2015, Wojtkowski is a Fellow of the Optical Society of America, and since 2016 he is a corresponding member of the Polish Academy of Arts and Sciences.

References 

Living people
1975 births
Polish physicists
People from Włocławek
Nicolaus Copernicus University in Toruń alumni